Bora Aydınlık (born 9 May 2005) is a footballer who currently plays as a forward for Fenerbahçe. Born in the United States, he is a youth international for Turkey.

Club career
Born in Miami Beach, Florida, Aydınlık moved to Turkey at a young age, joining Fenerbahçe in 2015. Starting out as a left-back, he moved further up the pitch and mostly operates as a left-winger or striker. He is seen as a potential future superstar for Fenerbahçe, and he has been compared to teammate Arda Güler in this regard.

His first taste of senior action came when he was named on the bench for a UEFA Europa Conference League game against Slavia Prague in February 2022.

International career
Aydınlık is eligible to represent both the United States and Turkey at international level. In March 2022, he was called up to the United States men's national soccer team.

He has since gone on to represent Turkey at under-19 level.

Career statistics

Club

Notes

References

2005 births
Living people
Sportspeople from Miami Beach, Florida
Turkish footballers
Turkey youth international footballers
American soccer players
American people of Turkish descent
Association football forwards
Fenerbahçe S.K. footballers